FOC may refer to:

Places
 Falls of Cruachan railway station, in Scotland
 Fuzhou Changle International Airport, in Fujian, China

Arts, entertainment, and media

Gaming
 Transformers: Fall of Cybertron, a video game
 Star Wars: Empire at War: Forces of Corruption, an expansion for the game Star Wars: Empire at War

Music
 FOC (album), by Australian rock group Far Out Corporation
 Far Out Corporation, an Australian band
 Flag of Convenience (band), an English rock band

Other arts, entertainment, and media
 Flight of the Conchords, a New Zealand comedy duo

Communications and technology 
 Faint Object Camera, on the Hubble Space Telescope
 Festival of Code, an annual hackathon
 Fiber optic cable
 Field-oriented control

Occupations or roles
 Father of the Chapel, a trade union official
 Friend of the court

Organizations
 Federal Office of Culture, in Switzerland
 Finnish Organization of Canada, a cultural organisation
 First Class CW Operators' Club, an Amateur Radio Morse code organisation
 Workers Front of Catalonia

Other uses 
 Foc (Barcelona Metro), a railway station in Barcelona, Spain
 First order condition
 Final Order Cutoff, allowance to increase or/and decrease quantity numbers in orders until print run day
 Flag of convenience (business)
 Flag of convenience
 Focus (linguistics)
 Forward of center (or front of center), a measure of the weight bias of an arrow
 Fractional-order control
 Free of charge
 Freedom of choice
 Full operational capability
 Fusarium oxysporum f. sp. cubense or Foc, the pathogen of Panama disease/Fusarium wilt of banana

See also

FOCS (disambiguation)